The 7th Central Committee of the Workers' Party of Korea was elected by the 7th Congress on 9 May 2016, and remained in session until the election of the 8th Central Committee on 10 January 2021. In between party congresses and specially convened conferences the Central Committee is the highest decision-making institution in the WPK and North Korea. The Central Committee is not a permanent institution and delegates day-to-day work to elected bodies, such as the Presidium, the Politburo, the Executive Policy Bureau, the Central Military Commission and the Control Commission in the case of the 7th Central Committee. It convenes meetings, known as "Plenary Session of the [term] Central Committee", to discuss major policies. Only full members have the right to vote, but if a full member cannot attend a plenary session, the person's spot is taken over by an alternate. Plenary session can also be attended by non-members, such meetings are known as "Enlarged Plenary Session", to participate in the committee's discussions.

On its election the 7th Central Committee was composed of 129 full members and 106 alternate members.

Plenums

Members

7th Congress (2016)

Full

Alternates

Changes (2017–20)

See also

Central Committee of the Workers' Party of Korea

References

Citations

Bibliography
 

7th Central Committee of the Workers' Party of Korea
2016 establishments in North Korea
2021 disestablishments in North Korea